The following railroads operate in the U.S. state of Pennsylvania.

Common freight carriers
Aliquippa and Ohio River Railroad (AOR) Genesee & Wyoming
Allegheny Valley Railroad (AVR)
Allentown & Auburn Railroad (ALLN)
BD Highspire Holdings (BDHH)
Belvidere and Delaware River Railway (BDRV)
Brandywine Valley Railroad (BVRY)
Buffalo and Pittsburgh Railroad (BPRR) (Genesee & Wyoming)
Canadian National Railway (CN) through subsidiary Bessemer & Lake Erie Railroad (BLE)
Canadian Pacific Railway (CP) through subsidiary Delaware & Hudson Railway (DH)
Central New York Railroad (CNYK)
Chestnut Ridge Railroad (CHR)
Columbia and Reading Railway (CORY)
Conrail Shared Assets Operations (CRR)
operates Philadelphia Belt Line Railroad (PBL)
CSX (CSX)
Delaware–Lackawanna Railroad (DL)
East Erie Commercial Railroad (EEC)
East Penn Railroad (ESPN) (Regional Rail, LLC)
Elizabethtown Industrial Railroad (EZR)
Everett Railroad (EV)
Gettysburg & Northern Railroad (GET)
Juniata Valley Railroad (JVRR) North Shore Railroad (Pennsylvania))
Kasgro Rail Lines (KRL)
Kiski Junction Railroad (KJR)
Landisville Railroad (LVR)
Lehigh Railway (LRWY)
Lehigh Valley Rail Management (LVRB, LVRC, LVRJ)
Luzerne & Susquehanna Railway (LS)
Lycoming Valley Railroad (LVRR) (North Shore Railroad (Pennsylvania))
Maryland Midland Railway (MMID) (Genesee & Wyoming)
Middletown & Hummelstown Railroad (MIDH)
New Castle Industrial Railroad (NCIR)
New Hope Railroad (NHRR)
New York, Susquehanna & Western Railway (NYSW)
Nittany & Bald Eagle Railroad (NBER) (North Shore Railroad (Pennsylvania))
Norfolk Southern (NS)
NDC Railroad (NDC)
North Shore Railroad (NSHR)
Oil Creek & Titusville Railroad (OCTL)
Pennsylvania & Southern Railway (PSCC)
Pennsylvania Northeastern Railroad (PN)
Pennsylvania Southwestern Railroad (PSWR)
Pittsburgh, Allegheny & McKees Rocks Railroad (PAM)
Pittsburgh & Ohio Central Railroad (POHC) (Genesee & Wyoming)
Reading Blue Mountain & Northern Railroad (RBMN)
R.J. Corman Railroad/Allentown Line (RJCN)
R.J. Corman Railroad/Pennsylvania Lines (RJCP)
Shamokin Valley Railroad (SVRR) (North Shore Railroad (Pennsylvania))
SMS Rail Lines (SRL)
Operates Penn Jersey Rail Lines
Southwest Pennsylvania Railroad (SWP)
Strasburg Railroad (SRC)
Tyburn Railroad (TYBR) (Regional Rail, LLC)
Union Railroad (URR)
Union County Industrial Railroad (UCIR) (North Shore Railroad (Pennsylvania))
Upper Merion & Plymouth Railroad (UMP)
Wellsboro & Corning Railroad (WCOR) (Genesee & Wyoming)
Western New York & Pennsylvania Railroad (WNYP)
Wheeling & Lake Erie Railway (WE)
York Railway (YRC) (Genesee and Wyoming)
Operates Maryland & Pennsylvania Railroad (Genesee & Wyoming) and Yorkrail
Youngstown & Southeastern Railroad (YSRR)

Private freight carriers
Cumberland Mine Railroad
Alpha Natural Resources
Conshohocken Recycling and Rail Transfer, Inc (CRRT)
Juniata Terminal Company (JTFS)
Leetsdale Industrial Terminal Railway (LIT)

Passenger carriers

Allentown & Auburn Railroad (heritage railroad)
Amtrak (AMTK) (national passenger rail)
CamTran (Johnstown mass transit agency operates Johnstown Inclined Plane)
Colebrookdale Railroad (heritage railroad)
Delaware Lackawanna RailRoad
East Broad Top Railroad and Coal Company 
Fayette Central Railroad (tourist trains operating over Southwest Pennsylvania Railroad trackage)
Kiski Junction Railroad (working railroad that also operates tourist trains)
Lehigh Gorge Scenic Railway (heritage railroad)
Lehigh Lackawanna RailRoad
Middletown and Hummelstown Railroad (working railroad, but with emphasis on tourist trains)
New Hope Railroad (working railroad that also operates tourist trains)
New Jersey Transit Rail Operations (Atlantic City Line commuter train travels from Philadelphia)
Oil Creek and Titusville Lines (working railroad, but with emphasis on tourist trains)
Pioneer Lines Scenic Railway (heritage railroad)
Port Authority of Allegheny County (Pittsburgh mass transit agency that operates The T light rail, the Monongahela Incline, and the Duquesne Incline)
Port Authority Transit Corporation (Bi-state authority operates Philadelphia-Camden County subway line)
Southeastern Pennsylvania Transportation Authority (Philadelphia mass transit agency that operates SEPTA Regional Rail commuter lines, the Philadelphia Subway, and a variety of suburban light rail lines)
Strasburg Railroad (heritage railroad)
Tioga Central Railroad (heritage railroad)
Wanamaker, Kempton and Southern Railroad (heritage railroad)
West Chester Railroad (heritage railroad)

Museums and historic sites
 Allegheny Portage Railroad
 Howard Tunnel
 Electric City Trolley Museum
 Gallitzin Tunnel
 Horseshoe Curve
 Mars Station, Pennsylvania
 Pennsylvania Trolley Museum
 Railroad Museum of Pennsylvania
 Reading Company Technical & Historical Society
 Rockhill Trolley Museum
 Steamtown National Historic Site
 Western Pennsylvania Model Railroad Museum

Defunct railroads

Electric
Adamsville and Mohnsville Electric Railway
Allegheny, Bellevue and Perrysville Railway
Allegheny Traction Company
Allegheny Valley Street Railway
Allen Street Railway
Allentown and Reading Traction Company
Altoona and Logan Valley Electric Railway
Ardmore and Llanerch Street Railway
Bangor and Portland Traction Company
Beaver Valley Traction Company
Bethlehem and Nazareth Passenger Railway
Birdsboro Street Railway
Blue Ridge Traction Company
Bradford Street Railroad
Butler Passenger Railway
Cambria Incline Plane Company
Carbon Street Railway
Carbondale Railway
Carlisle and Mechanicsburg Street Railway
Carlisle and Mount Holly Railway
Catherine and Bainbridge Streets Railway of Philadelphia
Centennial Passenger Railway
Central Pennsylvania Traction Company
Central Traction Company
Central Valley Railroad
Centre and Clearfield Street Railway
Chambersburg and Gettysburg Electric Railway
Chambersburg, Greencastle and Waynesboro Street Railway
Chester, Darby and Philadelphia Railway
Chester and Delaware Street Railway
Chester and Media Electric Railway
Chester Street Railway
Chester Traction Company
Citizens' Clearfield and Cambria Streets Railway
Citizens' East End Street Railway
Citizens' Passenger Railway
Citizens Passenger Railway
Citizens Traction Company
Citizens' Traction Company of Oil City, Pennsylvania
Clairton Street Railway
Coal Castle Electric Railway
Coatesville Traction Company
Collegeville Electric Street Railway
Colonial Street Railway
Columbia and Montour Electric Railway
Conestoga Traction Company
Conneaut and Erie Traction Company
Conshohocken Railway
Consolidated Traction Company
Continental Passenger Railway
Corry and Columbus Street Railway
Cumberland Railway
Danville and Bloomsburg Street Railway
Danville and Sunbury Transit Company
Delaware County and Philadelphia Electric Railway
Doylestown and Easton Street Railway
Doylestown and Willow Grove Railway
DuBois Traction Company
Duquesne Traction Company
East End Passenger Railway
East McKeesport Street Railway
East Reading Electric Railway
Easton and Bethlehem Transit Company
Easton, Palmer and Bethlehem Street Railway
Easton and South Bethlehem Transit Company
Easton Transit Company
Electric Traction Company
Empire Passenger Railway
Ephrata and Adamstown Railway
Erie Electric Motor Company
Erie Rapid Transit Street Railway
Erie Traction Company
Fairchance and Smithfield Traction Company
Fairmount Park and Haddington Passenger Railway
Fairmount Park Transportation Company
Federal Street and Pleasant Valley Passenger Railway
Frankford and Southwark Philadelphia City Passenger Railway
French Point Street Railway
Front and Fifth Streets Railway
Germantown Passenger Railway
Gettysburg Electric Railway
Girard Avenue Passenger Railway
Green and Coates Streets Passenger Railway
Hagerstown Railway
Hanover and McSherrystown Street Railway
Harrisburg City Passenger Railway
Harrisburg and Hummelstown Street Railway
Harrisburg and Mechanicsburg Electric Railway
Harrisburg Traction Company
Heston, Mantua and Fairmount Passenger Railway
Highland Grove Traction Company
Hillcrest Avenue Passenger Railway
Holmesburg, Tacony and Frankford Electric Railway
Homestead and Mifflin Street Railway
Hummelstown and Campbellstown Street Railway
Huntingdon, Lewistown and Juniata Valley Traction Company
Huntingdon Street Connecting Passenger Railway
Irwin–Herminie Traction Company
Jefferson Traction Company
Jersey Shore Electric Street Railway
Johnstown Passenger Railway
Johnstown Traction Company
Kessler Street Connecting Passenger Railway
Kittaning and Leechburg Railways
Kutztown and Fleetwood Street Railway
Lackawanna Valley Traction Company
Lackawanna and Wyoming Valley Railroad (L&WV)
Lake Erie Traction Company
Lancaster and Columbia Railway
Lancaster, Mechanicsburg and New Holland Railway
Lancaster, Petersburg and Manheim Railway
Lancaster and Quarryville Street Railway
Lancaster and Rocky Springs Railway
Lancaster and Southern Street Railway
Lancaster, Willow Street, Lampeter and Strasburg Railway
Lancaster and York Furnace Street Railway
Latrobe Street Railway
Lebanon Valley Street Railway
Lehigh Avenue Railway
Lehigh Traction Company
Lehigh Valley Transit Company
Lewisburg, Milton and Watsontown Passenger Railway
Lewistown and Reedsville Electric Railway
Linglestown and Blue Mountain Street Railway
Lykens and Williams Valley Street Railway
Mahoning Valley Street Railway
Meadville and Cambridge Springs Street Railway
Meadville Traction Company
Media, Glen Riddle and Rockdale Electric Street Railway
Media, Middletown, Aston and Chester Electric Railway
Middletown, Highspire and Steelton Street Railway
Monongahela Street Railway
Montgomery and Chester Electric Railway
Montgomery County Passenger Railway
Montgomery County Rapid Transit Company
Montgomery Traction Company
Montoursville Passenger Railway
Morningside Electric Street Railway
Mount Vernon Electric Street Railway
Mount Washington Street Railway
Neversink Mountain Railway
New Castle and Lowell Railway
New Holland, Blue Ball and Terre Hill Street Railway
New Homestead Street Railway
New Jersey and Pennsylvania Traction Company
Newtown Electric Railway
Newtown, Langhorne and Bristol Trolley Street Railway
Newtown and Yardley Street Railway
Northampton Central Street Railway
Northampton Traction Company
Northern Cambria Street Railway
Northern Electric Street Railway
Northern Passenger Railway
Norristown Passenger Railway
Northumberland County Traction Company
Oakdale and McDonald Street Railway
Oil City, Rouseville and Franklin Railway
Oil City Station Railway
Olean, Rock City and Bradford Railroad
Olean, Rock City and Bradford Electric Railroad
Oley Valley Railway
Oxford, West Grove and Avondale Street Railway
Patterson Heights Street Railway
Pennsylvania and Mahoning Valley Railway
Pennsylvania and Maryland Street Railway
Pennsylvania Motor Company
People's Railway
People's Passenger Railway
People's Street Railway of Nanticoke and Newport
Philadelphia, Bristol and Trenton Street Railway
Philadelphia, Cheltenham and Jenkintown Passenger Railway
Philadelphia and Chester Railway
Philadelphia City Passenger Railway
Philadelphia and Darby Railway
Philadelphia and Easton Electric Railway
Philadelphia and Easton Railway
Philadelphia and Garrettford Street Railway
Philadelphia and Grays Ferry Passenger Railway
Philadelphia, Morton and Swarthmore Street Railway
Philadelphia Rapid Transit Company
Philadelphia Suburban Transportation Company
Philadelphia Traction Company
Philadelphia and West Chester Traction Company
Philadelphia and Western Railroad
Philadelphia and Western Railway
Philadelphia and Willow Grove Street Railway
Pittsburgh and Allegheny Valley Railway
Pittsburgh and Birmingham Traction Company
Pittsburgh and Charleroi Street Railway
Pittsburgh, Harmony, Butler and New Castle Railway
Pittsburgh, McKeesport and Greensburg Railway
Pittsburgh, McKeesport and Westmoreland Railway
Pittsburgh Railways
Pittsburgh Traction Company
Pittston and Scranton Street Railway
Plymouth and Larksville Railway
Port Carbon and Middleport Electric Railway
Pottstown and Northern Street Railway
Pottstown Passenger Railway
Pottstown and Reading Street Railway
Pottsville and Reading Railway
Pottsville Union Traction Company
Quakertown Traction Railway
Reading City Passenger Railway
Reading and Southwestern Street Railway
Reading and Temple Electric Railway
Reading Traction Company
Reading Transit and Light Company
Red Lion and Windsor Street Railway
Ridge Avenue Connecting Railway
Ridge Avenue Passenger Railway
Rohrerstown, Landisville and Mount Joy Street Railway
Roxborough, Chestnut Hill and Norristown Railway
Schuylkill Railway
Schuylkill Electric Railway
Schuylkill Haven and Orwigsburg Street Railway
Schuylkill Valley Traction Company
Scranton Railway
Scranton and Carbondale Traction Company
Scranton, Dunmore, and Moosic Lake Railroad
Scranton and Northeastern Railroad
Scranton and Pittston Traction Company
Scranton Traction Company
Second and Third Streets Passenger Railway
Seventeenth and Nineteenth Streets Passenger Railway
Shamokin and Edgewood Electric Railway
Shamokin Extension Electric Railway
Shamokin and Mount Carmel Transit Company
Sharon and New Castle Street Railway
Sharon and Wheatland Street Railway
Shingle House Railroad
Slate Belt Electric Street Railway
South Bethlehem and Saucon Street Railway
South Side Passenger Railway
South Waverly Street Railway
Southwestern Street Railway
Stroudsburg Passenger Railway
Stroudsburg, Water Gap and Portland Railway
Suburban Rapid Transit Street Railway
Sunbury and Northumberland Electric Railway
Susquehanna Traction Company
Tamaqua and Lansford Street Railway
Tamaqua and Pottsville Electric Railroad
Thirteenth and Fifteenth Streets Passenger Railway
Titusville Electric Traction Company
Trappe and Limerick Electric Street Railway
Trenton, New Hope and Lambertville Street Railway
Tri-State Railway and Electric Company
Twenty-Second Street and Allegheny Avenue Passenger Railway
Union Passenger Railway
Union Traction Company of Philadelphia
United Traction Company
United Traction Company of Pittsburgh
United Traction Street Railway
Vallamont Traction Company
Valley Street Railway
Valley Traction Company
Walnut Street Connecting Passenger Railway
Warren County Traction Company
Warren and Jamestown Street Railway
Warren Street Railway
Washington and Canonsburg Railway
Waverly, Sayre and Athens Traction Company
Webster, Monessen, Belle Vernon and Fayette City Street Railway
West Chester Street Railway
West Chester, Kennett and Wilmington Electric Railway
West Fairview and Marysville Electric Street Railway
West Penn Railways
West Philadelphia Passenger Railway
West Side Electric Street Railway
Western New York and Pennsylvania Traction Company
Westmoreland County Railway
White Hill and Mechanicsburg Passenger Railway
Whitehall Street Railway
Wilkes-Barre Railroad
Wilkes-Barre Railway
Wilkes-Barre, Dallas and Harvey's Lake Railway
Wilkes-Barre and Hazleton Railroad
Wilkes-Barre and Wyoming Valley Traction Company
Williamsport Passenger Railway
Wissahickon Electric Passenger Railway
Wrightsville and York Street Railway
Yardley, Morrisville and Trenton Street Railway
York and Dallastown Electric Railway
York and Dover Electric Railway
York Haven Street Railway
York Street Railway
Youngsville and Sugar Grove Street Railway

Private carriers
Birmingham Coal Company
Clinton Coal Company
H.B. Hays and Brothers Coal Railroad
Lawrence Ore Company
Leiper Railroad
Mehard Coal Company
Perry Lumber Company
Shawnee Railroad

Passenger carriers
Mauch Chunk, Summit Hill and Switchback Railroad
Mauch Chunk Switchback Railway
Quakertown & Eastern Railroad
Valley Forge Scenic Railroad
Wawa and Concordville Railroad

Not completed
Blue Mountain Railroad
Duncannon, Landisburg and Broad Top Railroad
Harrisburg and Hamburg Railroad
Harrisburg and South Mountain Railroad
Pennsylvania Pacific Railway
Philipsburg and Johnstown Railroad
Pittsburgh, Binghamton & Eastern Railroad
Shermans Valley and Broad Top Railroad
South Mountain Railroad
South Pennsylvania Railroad
South Side Railroad

Notes

References

External links
Railroad Companies Operating in PA

 
 
Pennsylvania
Railroads